Nogometni klub Rudar Trbovlje, commonly referred to as NK Rudar Trbovlje or simply Rudar, is a Slovenian football club from Trbovlje, which plays in the Ljubljana Regional League, the fourth level of the Slovenian football system. The club have a long-standing local rivalry with NK Zagorje, which is known as the Zasavje Derby.

History

History of football in Trbovlje dates back to 1922, when ŠK Zora was established. In the same year, the club aroused a lot of interest in this sport among youth working class. In 1924, the club was banned after a political clash with Orjuna. Some former members then founded DSK Svoboda, which renamed as SK Amater in 1927.

On the 50th anniversary of the club, they won the Slovenian Republic League for the first time. A successful period lasted until 1980, as Rudar won the Republic titles two more times between 1974 and 1979.

With the collapse of Yugoslavia and the independence of Slovenia, all Slovenian teams returned from the federal leagues. Some of the key players left the club and Rudar was relegated from the newly established Slovenian PrvaLiga in the inaugural 1991–92 season. They never returned to the first division.

Honours
Slovenian Republic League (third tier in Yugoslavia)
Winners: 1971–72, 1973–74, 1978–79

Ljubljana Regional League (fourth tier in Slovenia)
Winners: 2011–12

MNZ Ljubljana Cup
Winners: 1993

References

External links

Official website 

Association football clubs established in 1922
Football clubs in Slovenia
1922 establishments in Slovenia
Trbovlje